Buffalo Zone is the third studio album by American country music duo Sweethearts of the Rodeo, released in 1990 via Columbia Records.  The album's cover was an obvious homage to The Byrds' 1968 album Sweetheart of the Rodeo, from which the duo derived their name.  The album was not as successful as their first two albums, Sweethearts of the Rodeo and One Time, One Night. Notable songs include "Uphill All the Way", "This Heart" (Billboard #25), "Hard Road to Go", and "Cómo Se Dice (I Love You)", although none charted very high.

Critical reception

In his Allmusic review, critic Jason Ankeny called the album "more melancholy" than their previous work.

Track listing

Personnel 
 Victor Battista – upright bass
 Eddie Bayers – drums
 Mark Casstevens – acoustic guitar
 Paul Franklin – dobro, pedal steel guitar
 Steve Gibson – electric guitar, mandolin
 Roy Huskey, Jr. – upright bass
 Albert Lee – electric guitar
 Tim Mensy – acoustic guitar
 Joey Miskulin – accordion
 Farrell Morris – vibraphone
 Phil Naish – keyboards
 Mark O'Connor – fiddle
 Tom Robb – bass guitar
 Ricky Skaggs – background vocals
 Harry Stinson – background vocals
 Pete Wasner – keyboards
 Curtis Young – background vocals

Production
 Steve Buckingham – producer
 Janis Gill – associate producer
 Marshall Morgan – engineer
 Denny Purcell – mastering
 Gary Paczosa – assistant engineer
 Brad Jones – assistant engineer
 Jeanne Kinney – assistant engineer
 Bill Johnson – artwork, art direction
 Dennis Davis – artwork, design, illustrations
 Beth Mallen – production assistant

Chart performance

References

1990 albums
Sweethearts of the Rodeo albums
Columbia Records albums
Albums produced by Steve Buckingham (record producer)